Azuma Dam  is a rockfill dam located in Hokkaido Prefecture in Japan. The dam is used for irrigation. The catchment area of the dam is 52 km2. The dam impounds about 93  ha of land when full and can store 10080 thousand cubic meters of water. The construction of the dam was started on 1959 and completed in 1970.

References

Dams in Hokkaido